You Belong to Me may refer to:

Film and literature 
 You Belong to Me (1934 film), a drama starring Helen Morgan
 You Belong to Me (1941 film), a romantic comedy starring Henry Fonda and Barbara Stanwyck
 You Belong to Me (2001 film), a television movie
 You Belong to Me, a novel by Mary Higgins Clark, basis for the 2001 film
 You Belong to Me (2007 film), a thriller starring Patti D'Arbanville
 You Belong to Me (2008 film), a television film starring Shannon Elizabeth
 You Belong to Me (2021 film), a psychological thriller also known as Every Breath You Take

Music

Songs 
 "You Belong to Me" (1952 song), a song popularized by Patti Page and Jo Stafford, as well as more recently by Bob Dylan and, later, Tori Amos
 "You Belong to Me" (Carly Simon song), originally recorded by The Doobie Brothers
 "You Belong to Me" (JX song), by Jake Williams recording as JX, featuring Shena
 "You Belong with Me", a 2009 song by Taylor Swift
 "You Belong to Me", a song by Elvis Costello from This Year's Model
 "You Belong to Me", a song by Bryan Adams from Get Up 
 "You Belong to Me", a song by Trey Songz from Anticipation

Albums 
 Jo Stafford albums:
 You Belong to Me (1989 Jo Stafford album)
 You Belong to Me (ASV/Living Era), 2004
 You Belong to Me (Memoir), 2004
 You Belong to Me (Rajon), 2004
 You Belong to Me (Remember), 2004
 You Belong to Me (2008 Jo Stafford album)
 You Belong to Me, a 1962 album by The Duprees

See also 
 "Tonight You Belong to Me", by Billy Rose and Lee David
 I Belong to You (disambiguation)